"Money Made" is the fourth single from Australian rock band AC/DC from their fifteenth studio album Black Ice. The song was released only through radio airplay in Australia in July 2009, and in the UK as a CD along with "War Machine". Angus Young declared that his inspiration for the song was the obsession with money in the United States – "The focus seems to be, 'How do we get money out of this? Do we keep that school? Is there a profit in it? Do we really need that new hospital? Can you not die quicker? Do we really have to spend money on that medicine? How old are you now?' Sometimes you think, 'Can we all take one deep breath?' The basics have got to be in place. Thirty years ago, a fuckin' school never made money. Filling in a road or putting up a traffic light didn't make money. Hospitals were there to keep people well, not make money." Bassist Cliff Williams has stated it is his favourite track from Black Ice, saying, "It has a chaingang vibe to it."

Personnel
Brian Johnson – lead vocals
Angus Young – lead guitar
Malcolm Young – rhythm guitar
Cliff Williams – bass guitar
Phil Rudd – drums

References

AC/DC songs
Songs written by Angus Young
Songs written by Malcolm Young
Song recordings produced by Brendan O'Brien (record producer)
2009 singles
Protest songs
2008 songs
Columbia Records singles